San Giovanni Valdarno is a town and comune in the province of Arezzo, Tuscany, central Italy, located in the valley of the Arno River.

History
According  to the Italian medieval historian Giovanni Villani, the town was founded in 1296, by the Republic of Florence.  The design of the historic center is based on the organization of Roman cities with a large central piazza from which two main roads run perpendicular to each other.  From these two main roads run other secondary streets.

The town is the birthplace of the early Renaissance painter Masaccio.

Main sights
 Palazzo Pretorio or Palazzo d'Arnolfo (13th century)
 Convent of San Francesco a Montecarlo. It houses an Incoronation of the Virgin by Neri di Bicci (1472–1475)
 Basilica of Santa Maria delle Grazie (built in 1484, but with a 19th-century Neoclassical façade). Its museum houses Beato Angelico's Annunciation.
 Church of San Lorenzo (early 14th century)

Sister cities
  Mahbes, Western Sahara
  Corning, USA

References 

Cities and towns in Tuscany